Christopher Collins, also known as Chris Latta (1949–1994), was an American actor, voice artist and comedian.

Christopher Collins may also refer to:
 Christopher Collins (cricketer) (1859–1919), English cricketer
 Christopher Graham Collins, birth name of the British comedian Frank Skinner
 Christopher Henn-Collins (1915–2006), British soldier and inventor

See also
 Chris Collins (disambiguation)
 Collins (disambiguation)